Andrew J. Cherlin (9 September 1948) is an American sociologist, focusing in economic disparities, currently at Johns Hopkins University and an Elected Fellow of the American Academy of Political and Social Science.

References

1948 births
Living people
Johns Hopkins University faculty
American sociologists